Hung Doan is an American poker player and a World Series of Poker bracelet winner.

She was a World Series of Poker champion in the 2004 $1,000 Ladies - No Limit Hold'em event.  As of 2014, her total live tournament winnings exceed $70,000.

World Series of Poker bracelets

References

American poker players
Female poker players
World Series of Poker bracelet winners
Living people
Year of birth missing (living people)